Canadian singer-songwriter, producer and pianist Chantal Kreviazuk has written, produced and performed on albums and tracks for a wide range recording artists, spanning from adult contemporary, pop, rock, to indie and hip-hop music. Initially, she began writing her own pop songs, especially after a 1994 motorcycle accident in Italy left her immobile for several months, and was signed by Sony Canada, where she released her debut album in June 1997. Kreviazuk later released another album in 1999, before being featured in a range of soundtracks to films and TV series. Kreviazuk began writing for other artists in 2001, where she co-wrote the song "Always and Forever" for Eleanor McCain. However, it was only in 2004 that Kreviazuk started writing for more artists and received recognition as a songwriter. In the summer of 2003, Kreviazuk met Canadian singer-songwriter Avril Lavigne, they formed a relationship of mutual respect and sisterhood, and eventually became songwriting partners. Also in 2004, Kreviazuk co-wrote "Rich Girl", for Gwen Stefani's solo debut album, Love. Angel. Music. Baby.. The song became a chart success, reaching the top-ten in over fifteen countries. 

In 2006, Kreviazuk continued to co-write songs for artists with her husband Raine Maida, including The Veronicas' "Revolution" (a top-twenty hit), Canadian Idol winner Eva Avila's debut single "Meant to Fly" (a number-one hit in Canada) and others. Kreviazuk also co-wrote songs for her husband, including Maida's debut album The Hunters Lullaby (2007), while also writing for famous artists, such as Mandy Moore for her fifth studio album Wild Hope (2007), on the track "Gardenia", and Kelly Clarkson's third studio album My December (2007), on the track "One Minute", which became a top-forty hit in Australia. In 2008, Kreviazuk wrote for American Idol winner David Cook's eponymous debut album, co-writing a track called "Permanent", which became a success in Canada and the U.S..

As writer

References

External links

Chantal Kreviazuk Production Discography

Production discographies
Discographies of Canadian artists